The 1950 St. Louis Browns season involved the Browns finishing 7th in the American League with a record of 58 wins and 96 losses.

Offseason 
 October 3, 1949: Ralph Winegarner was released by the Browns.
 December 5, 1949: Grant Dunlap was drafted by the Browns from the Cleveland Indians in the 1949 minor league draft.
 December 13, 1949: Bob Dillinger and Paul Lehner were traded by the Browns to the Philadelphia Athletics for Ray Coleman, Billy DeMars, Frankie Gustine, Ray Ippolito (minors) and $100,000.
 Prior to 1950 season: Bud Black was signed as an amateur free agent by the Cardinals.

Regular season

Season standings

Record vs. opponents

Notable transactions 
 May 11, 1950: Grant Dunlap was returned by the Browns to the Cleveland Indians.
 July 1, 1950: Jack Bruner was purchased by the Browns from the Chicago White Sox.
 August 1950: Chuck Oertel was acquired by the Browns from the Baxley-Hazelhurst Red Sox.

Roster

Player stats

Batting

Starters by position 
Note: Pos = Position; G = Games played; AB = At bats; H = Hits; Avg. = Batting average; HR = Home runs; RBI = Runs batted in

Other batters 
Note: G = Games played; AB = At bats; H = Hits; Avg. = Batting average; HR = Home runs; RBI = Runs batted in

Pitching

Starting pitchers 
Note: G = Games pitched; IP = Innings pitched; W = Wins; L = Losses; ERA = Earned run average; SO = Strikeouts

Other pitchers 
Note: G = Games pitched; IP = Innings pitched; W = Wins; L = Losses; ERA = Earned run average; SO = Strikeouts

Relief pitchers 
Note: G = Games pitched; W = Wins; L = Losses; SV = Saves; ERA = Earned run average; SO = Strikeouts

Farm system 

LEAGUE CHAMPIONS: Marshall

References

External links
1950 St. Louis Browns team at Baseball-Reference
1950 St. Louis Browns season at baseball-almanac.com

St. Louis Browns seasons
Saint Louis Browns season
St Louis Browns